= The Click Trap =

The Click Trap is a 2024 documentary film which explores the digital advertising industry and the harms it causes.
